Closer to Heaven is an album of songs from the Pet Shop Boys 2001 stage musical Closer to Heaven. The songs feature the original London production cast and production credits go to Pet Shop Boys and Stephen Hague.

Track listing
"My night" - Billie Trix and Cast
"Something special" - Straight Dave
"Closer to heaven" - Shell and Straight Dave
"In denial" - Vic and Shell
"Call me old-fashioned" - Bob Saunders
"Nine out of ten" - Shell and Straight Dave
"It's just my little tribute to Caligula, darling!" - Billie Trix and Billie's Babes
"Hedonism"
"Friendly fire" - Billie Trix
"Shameless" - Vile Celebrities
"Vampires" - Vic and Billie Trix
"Closer to heaven" - Straight Dave and Mile End Lee
"Out of my system" - Shell and Billie's Babes
"K-Hole" - Billie Trix
"For all of us" - Straight Dave
"Closer to heaven" - Straight Dave
"Positive role model" - Straight Dave

Personnel
Neil Tennant 
Chris Lowe
Frances Barber (Billie Trix)
Paul Keating (Straight Dave) 
Stacey Roca (Shell Christian) 
Tom Walker (Mile End Lee)
David Burt (Vic Christian)
Paul Broughton (Bob Saunders)
David Langham (Flynn)
 
Guest musicians
Chris Nightingale - Programming, additional keyboards and arrangements. Piano on 9 & 15
Chuck Norman - Programming
Pete Gleadall - Original programming 
Chris Zippel - Original programming and production on 17 
Tessa Niles, Katie Kissoon, Carol Kenyon & Tommy Blazie - Backing vocals on 1 & 10
Claire Worall - Backing vocals on 10
Jonathan Harvey - Backing vocals on 5
Mark Stanway & Louie Spence - Solo vocals on 10
Craig Armstrong - Orchestration and original production on 11  
C.Jay Ranger - Solo vocals on 10 & backing vocals on 13
Akiya Henry - Backing vocals on 13

Chart performance

Cast recordings
Pet Shop Boys albums
Albums produced by Stephen Hague
2001 soundtrack albums
Theatre soundtracks